A compressor stall is a local disruption of the airflow in the compressor of a gas turbine or turbocharger. A stall that results in the complete disruption of the airflow through the compressor is referred to as a compressor surge. The severity of the phenomenon ranges from a momentary power drop barely registered by the engine instruments to a complete loss of compression in case of a surge, requiring adjustments in the fuel flow to recover normal operation.

Compressor stall was a common problem on early jet engines with simple aerodynamics and manual or mechanical fuel control units, but has been virtually eliminated by better design and the use of hydromechanical and electronic control systems such as Full Authority Digital Engine Control. Modern compressors are carefully designed and controlled to avoid or limit stall within an engine's operating range.

Types

There are two types of compressor stall:

Rotating stall
Rotating stall is a local disruption of airflow within the compressor which continues to provide compressed air, but with reduced effectiveness.  Rotating stall arises when a small proportion of airfoils experience airfoil stall, disrupting the local airflow without destabilising the compressor. The stalled airfoils create pockets of relatively stagnant air (referred to as stall cells) which, rather than moving in the flow direction, rotate around the circumference of the compressor. The stall cells rotate with the rotor blades, but at 50 to 70% of their speed, affecting subsequent airfoils around the rotor as each encounters the stall cell.  Propagation of the instability around the flow path annulus is driven by stall cell blockage causing an incidence spike on the adjacent blade.  The adjacent blade stalls as a result of the incidence spike, thus causing stall cell "rotation" around the rotor.  Stable local stalls can also occur which are axi-symmetric, covering the complete circumference of the compressor disc, but only a portion of its radial plane, with the remainder of the face of the compressor continuing to pass normal flow.

A rotational stall may be momentary, resulting from an external disturbance, or may be steady as the compressor finds a working equilibrium between stalled and unstalled areas. Local stalls substantially reduce the efficiency of the compressor and increase the structural loads on the airfoils encountering stall cells in the region affected. In many cases however, the compressor airfoils are critically loaded without capacity to absorb the disturbance to normal airflow such that the original stall cells affect neighbouring regions and the stalled region rapidly grows to become a complete compressor stall.

Axi-symmetric stall or compressor surge 
Axi-symmetric stall, more commonly known as compressor surge; or pressure surge, is a complete breakdown in compression resulting in a reversal of flow and the violent expulsion of previously compressed air out through the engine intake, due to the compressor's inability to continue working against the already-compressed air behind it. The compressor either experiences conditions which exceed the limit of its pressure rise capabilities or is highly loaded such that it does not have the capacity to absorb a momentary disturbance, creating a rotational stall which can propagate in less than a second to include the entire compressor.

The compressor will recover to normal flow once the engine pressure ratio reduces to a level at which the compressor is capable of sustaining stable airflow.  If, however, the conditions that induced the stall remain, the return of stable airflow will reproduce the conditions at the time of surge and the process will repeat. Such a "locked-in" or self-reproducing stall is particularly dangerous, with very high levels of vibration causing accelerated engine wear and possible damage, even the total destruction of the engine through the breaking of compressor and stator vanes and their subsequent ingestion, destroying engine components downstream.

Causes
A compressor will only pump air in a stable manner up to a certain pressure ratio. Beyond this value the flow will break down and become unstable. This occurs at what is known as the surge line on a compressor map. The complete engine is designed to keep the compressor operating a small distance below the surge pressure ratio on what is known as the operating line on a compressor map. The distance between the two lines is known as the surge margin on a compressor map. Various things can occur during the operation of the engine to lower the surge pressure ratio or raise the operating pressure ratio. When the two coincide there is no longer any surge margin and a compressor stage can stall or the complete compressor can surge as explained in preceding sections.

Factors which erode compressor surge margin
The following, if severe enough, can cause stalling or surging.
Ingestion of foreign objects which results in damage, as well as sand and dirt erosion, can lower the surge line.
Dirt build-up in the compressor and wear that increases compressor tip clearances or seal leakages all tend to raise the operating line. 
Complete loss of surge margin with violent surging can occur with a bird strike. Taxiing on the ground, taking off, low level flying (military) and approaching to land all take place where bird strikes are a hazard. When a bird is ingested by a compressor the resultant blockage and airfoil damage causes compressor surging. Examples of debris on a runway or aircraft carrier flight deck that can cause damage are pieces of tire rubber, litter and nuts and bolts. A specific example is a metal piece dropped from another plane.  Runways and aircraft carrier flight decks are cleaned frequently in an attempt to preclude ingestion of foreign objects.
 Aircraft operation outside its design envelope; e.g., extreme flight manoeuvres resulting in airflow separations within the engine intake, flight in icing conditions where ice can build up in the intake or compressor, flight at excessive altitudes.
 Engine operation outside its flight manual procedures; e.g., on early jet engines abrupt throttle movements (slam acceleration) when pilot's notes specified slow throttle movements. The excessive over-fuelling raised the operating line until it met the surge line. (Fuel control capability extended to automatically limit the over-fuelling to prevent surging).
 Turbulent or hot airflow into the engine intake, e.g., use of reverse thrust at low forward speed, resulting in re-ingestion of hot turbulent air or, for military aircraft, ingestion of hot exhaust gases from missile firing.
 Hot gases from gun firing which may produce inlet distortion; e.g., Mikoyan MiG-27.

Effects 	

Compressor axially-symmetric stalls, or compressor surges, are immediately identifiable, because they produce one or more extremely loud bangs from the engine.  Reports of jets of flame emanating from the engine are common during this type of compressor stall. These stalls may be accompanied by an increased exhaust gas temperature, an increase in rotor speed due to the large reduction in work done by the stalled compressor and — in the case of multi-engine aircraft — yawing in the direction of the affected engine due to the loss of thrust.

Response and recovery
The appropriate response to compressor stalls varies according to the engine type and situation, but usually consists of immediately and steadily decreasing thrust on the affected engine.  While modern engines with advanced control units can avoid many causes of stall, jet aircraft pilots must continue to take this into account when dropping airspeed or increasing throttle.

Notable stall occurrences

Aircraft development

Rolls-Royce Avon engine 
The Rolls-Royce Avon turbojet engine was affected by repeated compressor surges early in its 1940s development which proved difficult to eliminate from the design. Such was the perceived importance and urgency of the engine that Rolls-Royce licensed the compressor design of the Sapphire engine from Armstrong Siddeley to speed development.

The engine, as redesigned, went on to power aircraft such as the English Electric Canberra bomber, and the de Havilland Comet and Sud Aviation Caravelle airliners.

Olympus 593
During the 1960s development of the Concorde Supersonic Transport (SST) a major incident occurred when a compressor surge caused a structural failure in the intake. The hammershock which propagated forward from the compressor was of sufficient strength to cause an inlet ramp to become detached and expelled from the front of the intake. The ramp mechanism was strengthened and control laws changed to prevent a re-occurrence.

Aircraft crashes

U.S. Navy F-14 crash 
A compressor stall contributed to the 1994 death of Lt. Kara Hultgreen, the first female carrier-based United States Navy fighter pilot.  Her aircraft, a Grumman F-14 Tomcat, experienced a compressor stall and failure of its left engine, a Pratt & Whitney TF30 turbofan, due to disturbed airflow caused by Hultgreen's attempt to recover from an incorrect final approach position by executing a sideslip; compressor stalls from excessive yaw angle were a known deficiency of this type of engine.

Southern Airways Flight 242 
The 1977 loss of Southern Airways Flight 242, a McDonnell Douglas DC-9-9-31, while penetrating a thunderstorm cell over Georgia was attributed to compressor stalls brought on by ingestion of large quantities of water and hail. The stalls caused blades to clash with stationary vanes in both of its Pratt & Whitney JT8D-9 turbofan engines. The stalls were so severe as to cause the destruction of the engines, leaving the flight crew with no choice but to make an emergency landing on a public road, killing 62 passengers and another eight people on the ground.

1997 Irkutsk Antonov An-124 crash 
An Antonov 124 transport plane was destroyed when it crashed immediately after takeoff from Irkutsk-2 Airport in Russia. Climbing away with a high angle of attack, engines 1 and 2 also surged, causing the aircraft to crash some  past the end of the runway. It struck several houses in a residential area, killing all 23 on board, and 45 people on the ground.

Trans World Airlines Flight 159 
On November 6, 1967, TWA Flight 159, a Boeing 707 on its takeoff roll from the then-named Greater Cincinnati Airport, passed Delta Air Lines Flight 379, a McDonnell Douglas DC-9 stuck in the dirt a few feet off the runway's edge. The first officer on the TWA aircraft heard a loud bang, now known to have been a compressor stall induced by ingestion of exhaust from Delta 379 as it was passed.  Believing a collision had occurred, the copilot aborted the takeoff. Because of its speed, the aircraft overran the runway, injuring 11 of the 29 passengers, one of whom died four days later as a result of the injuries.

Scandinavian Airlines Flight 751
In December 1991 Scandinavian Airlines Flight 751, a McDonnell Douglas MD-81 on a flight from Stockholm to Copenhagen, crashed after losing both engines due to ice ingestion leading to compressor stall shortly after takeoff. Due to a newly installed auto-throttle system designed to prevent pilots reducing power during the takeoff climb, the pilot's commands to reduce power on recognising the surge were countermanded by the system, leading to engine damage and total engine failure. The airliner successfully made a forced landing in a forest clearing without loss of life.

See also
 Axial fan design
 Surge in compressors

References
The Jet Engine — Rolls-Royce plc, 1995. .

Notes

Bibliography

Kerrebrock, Jack L. "Aircraft Engines and Gas Turbines", 2nd edition. Cambridge, Massachusetts: The MIT Press, 1992. .

External links

Aviation risks